Pioneer Valley Performing Arts Charter Public School (PVPA) is a public charter school in South Hadley, Massachusetts, United States. It was established in 1996 as part of the Massachusetts Educational Reform. It was originally located in Hadley, Massachusetts, but relocated to South Hadley for its tenth year in 2005.

Overview
Pioneer Valley Performing Arts Charter Public School in Western Massachusetts is known for its performing and visual arts concentrations woven into its curriculum. Students are required to take all courses that Massachusetts public schools mandate (mathematics, science, English, languages, history, etc.) but also participate in a wide variety of performing arts and visual art courses. These include courses in instrumental and vocal music, many styles of dance, theater, visual arts, film, and musical theater. The students also participate in the revision of the school charter as a democratic process when the charter goes through renewals.

The school has two performance spaces, a main theater and a studio theater. In the 2005–06 school year, PVPA made a deal with the Academy of Music to hold their musical production of the year at their facilities. From 2009 to 2011, PVPA relocated their musicals to University of Massachusetts Amherst's Bowker Auditorium. In 2012, PVPA's musical productions relocated back to the Academy of Music, and many of the school's other productions were held there as well. In 2016, PVPA opened their new mainstage theater at their South Hadley campus, and the majority of PVPA productions are now held there

Professional Performance Groups/Productions
Music
 Groovy Truth Jazz Ensemble
 Pop RnB
 Earwrum Rock Ensemble
 Spectrum ACapella
 Rock and Soul Revue

Dance
 Catalyst (Contemporary)
 WOFA (African Drum and Dance)
 Senior Dance Thesis
Funkadelic (Hip Hop), 2016-2019

Theatre
Fall High School Play
 Winter Musical
 Spring High School Play
 Spring Middle School Play
Senior Theatre Thesis
 Headgear Sketch Comedy

Notable alumni 
 Michael Brooks, political commentator, talk show host, and comedian
 Elisha Yaffe, comedian, actor and producer
 Naia Kete, singer and songwriter
 Seth Glier, singer and songwriter
 Sonya Kitchell, singer and songwriter
 Zoe Weizenbaum, actor
 Alex Clark, Youtuber, comedian, animator and juggler

References

External links 
 

Charter schools in Massachusetts
Schools of the performing arts in the United States
Public high schools in Massachusetts
Public middle schools in Massachusetts
South Hadley, Massachusetts